Total Recall is the third album released by rapper, Luni Coleone. It was released on March 14, 2000 for the Ideal Music Group and was produced Luni Coleone, Killa Tay, Lo-Key, Hugh Heff and Hollis. This was Luni Coleone's using that name, as he had used the name "Lunasicc" for his first two albums. Total Recall peaked at No. 33 on the Billboard Independent Albums chart. The album's title and cover pay homage to the film of the same name.

Track listing

2000 albums
Luni Coleone albums
Albums produced by Big Hollis